Edvin Loach, also Edwin Loach, is a village in the civil parish of Edvin Loach and Saltmarshe, in east Herefordshire, England, and about  north of the town of Bromyard, and east from Edwyn Ralph civil parish.

The old church at Edvin Loach was built in the mid-11th century or later and was dedicated to St Giles. It is built within the earthworks of a Norman motte-and-bailey castle. Later it was re-dedicated to St Mary. The old church gradually became dilapidated, though its roof was still intact as late as the 1890s. It is in the guardianship of English Heritage. The new St Mary's Church, designed by Victorian architect Sir George Gilbert Scott in 1860, stands next to the ruins of the old church. It is an example of 19th-century church architecture designed in Early English style.

References

External links

 Edvin Loach Old Church, English Heritage

Villages in Herefordshire